The Second Anglo-Sikh War was a military conflict between the Sikh Empire and the British East India Company that took place in 1848 and 1849. It resulted in the fall of the Sikh Empire, and the annexation of the Punjab and what subsequently became the North-West Frontier Province, by the East India Company.

On 19 April 1848 Patrick Vans Agnew of the civil service and Lieutenant William Anderson of the Bombay European regiment, having been sent to take charge of Multan from Diwan Mulraj Chopra, were murdered there, and within a short time the Sikh troops joined in open rebellion. Governor-General of India Lord Dalhousie agreed with Sir Hugh Gough, the commander-in-chief, that the British East India Company's military forces were neither adequately equipped with transport and supplies, nor otherwise prepared to take the field immediately. He also foresaw the spread of the rebellion, and the necessity that must arise, not merely for the capture of Multan, but also for the entire subjugation of the Punjab. He therefore resolutely delayed to strike, organized a strong army for operations in November, and himself proceeded to the Punjab. Despite the brilliant successes gained by Herbert Edwardes against Mulraj, and Gough's indecisive victories at the Battle of Ramnagar in November and at the Battle of Chillianwala on 13 January 1849, the stubborn resistance at Multan showed that the task required the utmost resources of the government. At length, on 22 January, Multan was taken by General Whish, who was thus set at liberty to join Gough's army. On 21 February, Gough won a complete victory at the Battle of Gujrat. The Sikh army was pursued to Rawalpindi, where it laid down its arms, and their Afghan allies retreated from the Punjab.

After the victory at Gujrat, Lord Dalhousie annexed the Punjab for the East India Company in 1849. For his services the Earl of Dalhousie received the thanks of the British parliament and a step in the peerage, as marquess.

Background
The Sikh Confederacy Misls of the Punjab were consolidated into an Empire and expanded by Maharaja Ranjit Singh during the early years of the nineteenth century. During the same period, the British East India Company's territories had been expanded until they were adjacent to the Punjab. Ranjit Singh maintained an uneasy alliance with the East India Company, while increasing the military strength of the Sikh Khalsa Army, which also saw itself as the embodiment of the state and religion, to deter British aggression against his state and to expand Sikh territory to the north and north west, capturing territory from Afghanistan and Kashmir.

When Ranjit Singh died in 1839, the Sikh Empire began to fall into disorder. There was a succession of short-lived rulers at the central Durbar (court), and increasing tension between the Army and the Durbar. The East India Company began to build up its military strength on the borders of the Punjab. Eventually, the increasing tension goaded the Sikh Army to invade British territory, under weak and possibly treacherous leaders.
The hard-fought First Anglo-Sikh War ended in defeat for the Sikh Army.

Aftermath of the First Anglo-Sikh War
At the end of the war, the Sikh Empire was forced to cede some valuable territory (the Jullundur Doab) to the East India Company, and Gulab Singh, the ruler of Jammu, was allowed to acquire entire Jammu and Kashmir from the Sikh Empire by a large cash payment to the East India Company. Some of the Sikh Army were forced to make an expedition to oust the Governor of Kashmir in favour of Gulab Singh.

The boy Maharaja Duleep Singh of the Sikh Empire was allowed to retain his throne, but a British Resident, Sir Henry Lawrence, controlled the policy of the Durbar. Duleep Singh's mother, Maharani Jind Kaur, continually tried to regain some of her former influence as Regent and was eventually exiled by Lawrence. While some Sikh generals and courtiers welcomed her dismissal, others resented Lawrence's action.  Furthermore, the Sikh Sardars were forced to considerably reduce their territorial and judicial control leaving only four Sardars in charge of the judiciary, with Sardar Chattar Singh Attariwalla controlling the area between the Jhelum and the Indus, Sardar Kahan Singh Mann controlling Lahore, Sardar Ram Singh Jallawala controlling the Chaj Doab, and Sardar Lehna Singh Majithia controlling the Majha including lands south east of the Ravi up to the hills and down to Kasur.

Some of the Sikh Army had to be kept in being, since many predominantly Muslim areas of the Sikh Empire threatened to ally with Dost Mohammed Khan in Afghanistan or to lapse into disorder, and only force of arms could keep them in subjugation. The British were unwilling to incur the financial and manpower costs of using large numbers of British or Bengal Army units for this task. To the contrary, the Governor-General of India, Viscount Hardinge sought to make economies after the war by reducing the size of the Bengal Army by 50,000 men. The Sardars (generals) of the Sikh Army naturally resented carrying out the orders of comparatively junior British officers and administrators.

Early in 1848, Sir Henry Lawrence, who was ill, departed on leave to England. Although it was assumed that his younger brother John Lawrence would be appointed in his place, Lord Dalhousie, who had replaced Lord Hardinge as Governor-General, appointed Sir Frederick Currie instead. Currie was a legalist, based in Calcutta, who was unfamiliar with military matters and with the Punjab. While the Lawrences were comparatively informal and familiar with the junior officers who were Residents and Agents in the various districts of the Punjab, Currie was stiffer in manner and was inclined to treat his subordinates' reports with caution. In particular, he refused to act on reports from James Abbott, the Political Agent in Hazara, who was convinced that Sardar Chattar Singh Attariwalla was actively plotting a rebellion with other Sirdars.

Sikh Rebellions

Multan Rebellion
The city of Multan was part of the Sikh kingdom, having been captured by Ranjit Singh in 1818. In 1848, it was governed by a Hindu viceroy, Dewan Mulraj. After the end of the First Anglo-Sikh war, Mulraj had behaved independently. When he was required by the British-controlled Durbar in Lahore to pay an increased tax assessment and revenues which were in arrears, Mulraj attempted to give up power to his son, so as to maintain his family's position as rulers. Currie instead appointed Sardar Kahan Singh Mann to succeed to the governorship and appointed a British Political Agent, Lieutenant Patrick Vans Agnew, to accompany him.

On 18 April 1848, Kahan Singh and Vans Agnew arrived at Multan with another officer, Lieutenant William Anderson, and a small escort. Mulraj handed over the keys of the fortress, but as Vans Agnew's party attempted to take possession, they were attacked by a party of Mulraj's irregular troops, and a mob from the city. Both officers were wounded, and were rescued by Kahan Singh. They were taken to a mosque outside the city. Their escorts defected to Mulraj, and the two officers were murdered by the mob the next day.

Mulraj later claimed that he had not instigated these attacks, but he was committed to rebellion because of them. He presented Vans Agnew's head to Kahan Singh and told him to take it back to Lahore. The news of the killings spread over the Punjab, and unrest and disquiet increased. Large numbers of Sikh soldiers deserted the regiments loyal to the Durbar to join those prepared to rebel under the leadership of Mulraj and disaffected Sirdars.

Battle of Kinyeri
Lieutenant Herbert Edwardes, the British Political Agent in Bannu, had been near Multan in April but was unable to save Vans Agnew. He hastily levied some Pakhtun irregular troops.

On 18 June 1848, 8,000 Bhawalpuris under Futteh Mohammed Khan, aided by 3,000 Sikh irregulars under Lieutenant Edwardes, fought 8,000 Sikhs under Rung Ram. The Bhawalpuris were repulsed in an attack on the Sikh positions, but the arrival of Lieutenant Edwardes' guns turned the scale, and at a second attempt the entrenchments were stormed and captured, with a loss to the victors of 300 men. The Sikhs lost 500 killed in the action, and many more during their flight to Multan.

Battle of Suddusain
Fought 1 July 1848, when a force of Bhawalpuris and British 18,000 strong, under Lieutenant Edwardes, encountered 12,000 Sikhs under Malraj. The Sikhs attacked, but were beaten off, largely owing to the superiority of the British artillery, and defeated with heavy loss.

Siege of Multan
Multan, defended by the Sikhs, under Mulraj, was besieged by Lieutenant Edwardes with about 1,200 men in July, 1848.

On learning of the events at Multan, Currie wrote to Sir Hugh Gough, the Commander in Chief of the Bengal Army, recommending that a major British force should at once move upon Multan. However Gough, supported by Dalhousie, the Governor General, declined to order major units of the East India Company to the Punjab until the end of the hot weather and monsoon seasons, which would not be until November. Instead, Currie ordered only a small force from the Bengal Army under General Whish, and several contingents of locally recruited irregulars and detachments of the Sikh Khalsa Army to join the siege. These forces joined Edwardes at Multan between 18 and 28 August. To the alarm of several Political Agents, the force from the Sikh Army included a large contingent commanded by Sardar Sher Singh Attariwalla, Chattar Singh's son.

Some Political Agents were already taking action to forestall outbreaks of rebellion. Captain John Nicholson, leading irregular cavalry based at Peshawar, seized the vital fort of Attock on the Indus River from its Sikh garrison while they were still unprepared, or undecided on rebellion. Nicholson's force then linked up with James Abbott's local Hazara levies to capture the Margalla Hills which separated Hazara from the other parts of the Punjab. When Chattar Singh openly rebelled in August, his force was unable to leave Hazara without fighting a battle. Although Chattar Singh twice succeeded in capturing the passes through the hills, he nevertheless failed to take advantage of this (possibly because of dissension among his senior officers and continual harassment by pro-British irregulars), and retreated into Hazara.

On 14 September, Sher Singh's army openly rebelled at Multan. He did not join Mulraj however. He and Mulraj conferred at a carefully chosen neutral site, at which it was agreed that Mulraj would give some money from his treasury to Sher Singh's army, which would march north into the Central Punjab and ultimately rejoin Chattar Singh. Meanwhile, Whish was forced to raise the siege on 22 September.

As the cold weather began in November, substantial contingents from the East India Company's armies at last took the field. A contingent from the Bombay Army (administered separately from the Bengal Army) had been ordered to reinforce Whish and besiege Multan. This force was delayed by a petty squabble over seniority and could arrive only when its first commander (who was senior to Whish and refused to serve under him) was replaced by a more junior officer. Whish's army was supplied and reinforced by sea and river transport up the rivers Indus and Chenab. Whish renewed the siege of Multan on 27 December, with 17,000 men and 64 guns. After a heavy bombardment the city was stormed on 2 January 1849. On 22 January, Mulraj surrendered the citadel. He was imprisoned for the remainder of his life. The ending of the siege allowed Whish, with large numbers of heavy guns, to reinforce the army under Sir Hugh Gough.

The British loss during the siege was 210 killed and 910 wounded.

Lahore Rebellion

Battle of Rungur Muzl Fort

Rungur Muzl fort was controlled by Sher Singh Attariwalla and was the first sign of revolt from the Lahore Durbar. The Sikhs from the army saw the British troops coming in and attacked them with full force. The Sikhs won the battle but soon they surrendered as there was a very small force.

Battle of Ramnagar

Sir Hugh Gough led his main force against Sher Singh's army, which defended the line of the River Chenab for several weeks. On 22 November, the Sikhs repelled a British cavalry attack on a bridgehead on the eastern side of the river at the Battle of Ramnagar. Although they subsequently withdrew from their exposed bridgehead, the Sikhs captured a British gun and inflicted heavy losses. They regarded the battle as a victory and their morale was raised.

Battle of Sadulpur
On 3 December 1848, Gough despatched a cavalry force under Major General Joseph Thackwell to cross the Chenab upstream of Ramnagar and turn the Sikh left, but Thackwell then paused to await infantry reinforcements, allowing the Sikhs to withdraw without interference. Gough claimed this indecisive action as a victory.

Battle of Chillianwala

At the start of 1849, Amir Dost Mohammed Khan of Afghanistan sided with the rebellious Sikhs, who agreed to cede the city of Peshawar and its surrounding area which had been conquered by Ranjit Singh early in the nineteenth century. Dost Mohammed Khan's support of the Sikhs was cautious, but when 3,500 Afghan horsemen approached the vital fort of Attock on the Indus River, its garrison of Muslim troops installed earlier by Nicholson defected. This allowed Chattar Singh to move out of Hazara and march west and then south, intending to link up with Sher Singh's army. Dalhousie had earlier ordered Gough to halt operations while waiting for Multan to fall, which would allow Whish to reinforce him. Learning of the fall of Attock, he instead ordered Gough to destroy Sher Singh's army before Chattar Singh could join him.

Gough unexpectedly encountered Sher Singh's position near the Jhelum River on 13 January 1849. Sher Singh had cunningly concealed his army, and Gough was faced with the choice of withdrawing, or attacking when it was late in the day. Gough unhesitatingly took the latter course. The resulting Battle of Chillianwala was desperately fought. Gough's troops, attacking into thick scrub without effective artillery support, suffered heavy losses. Some units lost their colours (which was regarded as a disgrace) and part of one British cavalry regiment fled in panic, resulting in the loss of four guns, also reckoned a humiliation. Sher Singh's army was also hard hit, losing twelve of its own guns.

Three days of heavy rain followed, discouraging both sides from renewing battle. After both armies had faced each other for three days without renewing the action, both withdrew. Sher Singh continued northwards to join Chattar Singh, which made the battle into a strategic British defeat. Gough nevertheless claimed a victory, which Dalhousie scornfully dubbed as "perhaps poetical."

There was much alarm at the losses Gough had suffered. His tactics were severely criticised. Military experts in Britain described him as a "superannuated general who could not mount his horse without assistance" and he was replaced by General Charles James Napier, who would require several weeks to arrive from England. Some junior officers reckoned that the true cause of the setback lay lower down the ranks. Promotion in both the British and Bengal armies came slowly, and by the time officers were appointed to command regiments and brigades, they were too old, and worn out by harsh climate and disease. At Chillianwala, several senior officers had proved unable to command their units effectively.

Battle of Gujrat

Meanwhile, Whish's force completed their siege works around Multan, their batteries opened fire and made a breach in the defences, which the infantry stormed. Mulraj surrendered on 22 January. The ending of the siege allowed Whish to reinforce Gough. In particular, Whish's division had large numbers of heavy guns, which the Sikhs lacked.

As Gough's army closed in on the Sikh Army, he sent William Hodson to scout the Sikh Army's position. Sher Singh attempted a last outflanking move, sending cavalry to cross the Chenab, and re-cross in Gough's rear. They were thwarted by heavy rains which made the river difficult to cross, and by British irregular cavalry led by Harry Burnett Lumsden. On 21 February, Gough attacked the Sikh Army at the Battle of Gujrat. Here, he began the battle with a three-hour bombardment from almost 100 guns, which drove the Sikhs from their hasty entrenchments. He then sent his cavalry, led by Sir Joseph Thackwell, and horse artillery after them in a pursuit which lasted for four hours. The Sikh loss was estimated at between 3,000 and 5,000 men and 53 guns; the British casualties were 96 killed and 700 wounded..

On 12 March, Chattar Singh and Sher Singh surrendered to Sir Walter Gilbert near Rawalpindi. Some 20,000 men (mainly irregular cavalry) laid down their arms. The Afghan contingent hastily withdrew through Attock and Peshawar, which the British reoccupied. Dost Mohammad Khan later signed a treaty acknowledging British possession of these cities.

Aftermath
Lord Dalhousie proclaimed annexation of the Punjab on 29 March 1849. His foreign secretary, Henry Meirs Elliot, arrived at Lahore to obtain the signatures of the members of the Council of Regency and of the minor king, Maharaja Duleep Singh. A darbar was held in the Lahore Fort and, with the British troops lined up on his right and his helpless Sardars on his left, the young Duleep Singh affixed his signatures to the document which deprived him of his crown and kingdom.

The Sikh defeat had several causes. Their administration of the population of the Punjab had been poor, which meant that their large armies found it difficult to find enough food while the East India Company had brought overwhelming force against them.

The Sikh Wars gave the two sides a mutual respect for each other's fighting prowess (although the war itself had been unchivalrously fought; the Sikhs took no prisoners at Chillianwala, and the British had taken no prisoners at Gujrat).

There was an increased recruitment of people from various communities of the Punjab in the Punjab Irregular Force under British command. These recruits fought for the East India Company during the Indian Rebellion of 1857, against the mutineers and other opponents (mostly high-caste Hindus from Eastern provinces, and forces or loyalists of Shia, Maratha and Mughal rulers). These Punjabi recruits had especially little sympathy with the Hindu mutineers of the Bengal Army, ironically contributed to by the latter's role in helping the British in the Anglo-Sikh wars. A long history of enmity of the Sikhs with Mughal rule did not help the mutineers' cause either, given their choice of Bahadur Shah Zafar as a symbolic leader.

Battle honour
The battle honour "Punjaub" was distributed with a free hand to all regiments employed in the operations of the Anglo-Sikh Wars during 1848–49 vide Gazette of the Governor General 277 of 1849, and the list of regiments honoured was issued vide. GoGG 803 of 1853. The Bombay Army was awarded separately and the spelling was changed from 'Punjaub' to 'Punjab' vide Gazette of India No. 1079 of 1910. Forty of the honoured units of the Bengal Army were consumed by the Mutiny. India has now raised a memorial at Ferozepore to pay homage to men of the Sikh Khalsa Army who laid down their lives in the Anglo-Sikh Wars and the battle honour is considered to be repugnant.

Units awarded this honour were:
 2nd Bengal Irregular Cavalry – presently 2nd Lancers (Gardner's Horse)
 1st, 2nd Scinde Irregular Horse – presently Scinde Horse
 7th Bengal Irregular Cavalry – presently 3rd Cavalry
 17th Bengal Irregular Cavalry – presently 18 Cavalry
 1st Company Bombay Foot Artillery – 5 Mtn Bty
 1st, 2nd, 3rd Companies Bengal Sappers and 1st through 7th Companies Bengal Pioneers – presently Bengal Engineer Group
 Bombay Sappers & Miners – presently Bombay Engineer Group
 9th Bombay Infantry – 4th Battalion, the Grenadiers
 3rd Bombay Infantry – 1st Battalion, the Maratha Light Infantry
 4th Bombay Infantry – 1st Battalion, the Rajputana Rifles, presently 3rd Battalion, the Brigade of Guards
 31st Bengal Infantry – 1st Battalion, the Rajput Regiment, presently 4th Battalion, the Brigade of Guards
 70th Bengal Infantry – 5th Battalion, the Rajput Regiment
 19th Bombay Infantry – 2nd Battalion, the Jat Regiment
 Corps of Guides – 10 Guides Cavalry
 1st Bombay Cavalry – 13th Duke of Connaught's Own Lancers
 1st Sikh Local Infantry and 2nd Sikh Local Infantry – 1st and 2nd Battalions, 12th Frontier Force Regiment
 1st Bengal Cavalry, 5th Bengal Cavalry, 6th Bengal Cavalry, 7th Bengal Cavalry, 8th Bengal Cavalry, 11th Bengal Cavalry (2nd Bengal Cavalry) – Mutinied 1857.
 3rd Bengal Irregular Cavalry, 9th Bengal Irregular Cavalry, 11th Bengal Irregular Cavalry, 12th Bengal Irregular Cavalry, 13th Bengal Irregular Cavalry, 14th Bengal Irregular Cavalry, 15th Bengal Irregular Cavalry. (16th Bengal Irregular Cavalry – Mutinied 1857).
 1st Bengal Infantry, 3rd Bengal Infantry, 4th Bengal Infantry, 8th Bengal Infantry, 13th Bengal Infantry, 15th Bengal Infantry, 18th Bengal Infantry, 20th Bengal Infantry, 22nd Bengal Infantry, 25th Bengal Infantry, 29th Bengal Infantry, 30th Bengal Infantry, 36th Bengal Infantry, 37th Bengal Infantry, 45th Bengal Infantry, 46th Bengal Infantry, 49th Bengal Infantry, 50th Bengal Infantry, 51st Bengal Infantry, 52nd Bengal Infantry, 53rd Bengal Infantry, 56th Bengal Infantry, 69th Bengal Infantry, 71st Bengal Infantry, 72nd Bengal Infantry, 73rd Bengal Infantry – Mutinied 1857.
 The Marine Battalion (10th Battalion, the Bombay Pioneers) – Disbanded 1933.

Notes

References

Further reading
 
 .

External links

 Second Anglo-Sikh War
 Anglo-Sikh Wars

Second
Conflicts in 1848
Conflicts in 1849
Battles involving the Sikhs
Military history of British India
History of Sikhism
1848 in India
1849 in India
History of the Bombay Sappers
History of the Bengal Sappers
History of the Corps of Engineers (Indian Army)